Cohasset Yacht Club is one of the oldest yacht clubs in America having been founded in 1894. It is a private sailing association located in Cohasett, Massachusetts. Women members of the club won the prestigious women's sailing competition for the Mrs. Charles Francis Adams Trophy nine times.

History
Famous members include Charles Francis Adams, 1920 America's Cup victor and skipper of Resolute (yacht); Franny Wakeman, 4-time winner of the Adams Cup; and F. Gregg Bemis, the only American to be awarded both the Herreshoff Trophy and the Beppe Croce Trophy in 1989.

A new clubhouse was built in 2016 after Hurricane Sandy to take the place of the original building which had lasted over 124 years. The structure was dedicated in 2018.

References

External links
 Cohasset Yacht Club

Yacht clubs in the United States
New England
Yachting
Sailing